William Claiborne Robinson, known as W. C. Robinson (April 25, 1861 – April 1, 1914), was a mathematics professor paid $800 per year  who was elevated for one year, 1889 to 1900,  as the  second president of Louisiana Tech University in Ruston, Louisiana.

Robinson began teaching at Louisiana Tech when the institution consisted of one building with eight classrooms, a science laboratory, an auditorium, two offices, and a small frame building which served as a workshop. One of the offices was used as a reading room, the modest forerunner of Prescott Memorial Library, named for the first college president, Arthur T. Prescott, who provided the original reading materials at his own expense.

In 1900, Robinson resigned as president to return to the classroom. He was succeeded by the English professor James B. Aswell, later a state superintendent of education, president of Northwestern State University in Natchitoches, Louisiana, and a member of the United States House of Representatives.
 
Little is known of Robinson himself, but much attention has been placed on the campus building, Robinson Hall, named in his honor. Constructed in 1939, twenty-five years after Robinson's death, the building was originally a men's dormitory which had fallen into disrepair by the middle 1960s. With a refurbished interior but with the exterior still unaltered and easily identified by former alumni, Robinson Hall is the home of the Louisiana Tech speech and hearing center. The three-story red brick structure is built in the Colonial Revival style of architecture. The contractor was the T. L. James Company of Ruston.

Robinson of Mount Lebanon, Louisiana, and his wife, Etta Asenah Moore Robinson (1869-1917) were both originally from Virginia. They had two children, Hunt Vaughn Robinson and Ealvise Conner Robinson, who died before their first birthdays as well as Herbert Lynn, Fred B., Esther, Virginia, Robert Hicks, and Luther William Robinson who survived to adulthood.  The Robinsons are interred at  Mt. Lebanon Cemetery near Gibsland in his native Bienville Parish. His gravestone has a Woodmen of the World emblem at the base.

A later Louisiana Tech president also has a tie to Mount Lebanon. Claybrook Cottingham was the last president of Southern Baptist-affiliated Mount Lebanon College from 1905 to 1906, when he became from 1906 to 1910 a founding professor of the new Louisiana College in Pineville. His tenure as LC president stretched from 1910 to 1941, when he accepted the highest position at Louisiana Tech, then known as Louisiana Polytechnic Institute. And sixty-two years after Robinson left the Louisiana Tech presidency, F. Jay Taylor, a Gibsland native, became president and held the position for twenty-five years.

References

 

 

1861 births
1914 deaths
People from Bienville Parish, Louisiana
People from Ruston, Louisiana
Educators from Louisiana
Presidents of Louisiana Tech University